The Codes is the English title for Szyfry, a Polish film released in 1966, directed by Wojciech Has.

Plot
Tadeusz (Jan Kreczmar) is a Polish veteran of World War II who fled to London at the end of the war, leaving behind his wife Zofia (Irena Eichlerówna) and two sons, Maciek (Zbigniew Cybulski) and Jedrek, who disappeared when he was 17 years old.

Tadeusz returns to Kraków to discover if Jedrek may be alive. His wife and son Maciek were members of resistance – was it possible that the second son may have been the traitor?

During Maciek's struggle to explain to his father their history during German occupation, questions arise concerning collaboration with the Gestapo and retribution by the Home Army. Has pictures the mystical lost boy in a dark fairy-tale forest, full of the war's ghosts and wholesale executions. The hypnotic quality of these excursions foreshadows the mesmerizing passages of Has' later film, The Hour-Glass Sanatorium.

Cast
Jan Kreczmar as Tadeusz 
Zbigniew Cybulski as Maciek 
Ignacy Gogolewski as Doctor Gross 
Irena Horecka as Aunt Helena 
Janusz Klosinski as Antiquary 
Adam Dzieszynski as Receptionist in 'Hotel Polski' 
Irena Eichlerówna as Zofia 
Janusz Gajos as White monk 
Barbara Krafftówna as Jadwiga 
Zofia Merle as Forester's daughter
Kazimierz Opaliński as Pieczara
Irena Orska as Neighbor

See also 
Cinema of Poland
List of Polish-language films

References

External links

1966 films
Polish war films
Films directed by Wojciech Has
1960s Polish-language films